When the Clock Strikes is a 1961 gangster film directed by Edward L. Cahn and starring James Brown and Merry Anders.

Plot
James Brown—no, the other one—is at Henry Corden's lodge near the state prison, where they're hanging a man on his testimony. Brown is an honest man, and his identification was not certain, and he said so. But it hanged the man, and now another has confessed. Brown meets Merry Anders, the dead man's widow at the lodge, who's looking for a clue towards $160,000 he stole from a bank.

It's a well written little thriller, with lots of sudden turns in the plot that kept me surprised. The problem is that it seems to have been shot on the cheapest of budgets, by Edward L. Cahn. Cahn was, in his long career, a competent journeyman; give him a good cast and he could turn out a good B picture. This one looks like it was shot for one of the television anthology series that flourished in the 1950s, without sufficient rehearsal time to modulate the performances. The result is a movie that probably played the drive-ins. Too bad. It could have been much more.

Cast
James Brown as Sam Morgan
Merry Anders as Ellie
Henry Corden as Cady
Roy Barcroft as Sheriff Mitchell
Peggy Stewart as Mrs. Pierce
Frances De Sales as Warden
Jorge Moreno as Martinez
Max Mellinger as Postman
Eden Hartford as Waitress
Jack Kenney as Cafe Proprietor

See also
 List of American films of 1961

References

External links

1961 films
1961 crime drama films
1960s English-language films
American black-and-white films
American crime drama films
Films directed by Edward L. Cahn
Films produced by Edward Small
Films scored by Richard LaSalle
United Artists films
1960s American films